Welcome is an unincorporated community and census-designated place in St. James Parish, Louisiana, United States. Its population was 800 as of the 2010 census. The community is located along Louisiana Highway 18 on the west bank of the Mississippi River.

Geography

Demographics

Notable person
Percy A. Pierre, American electrical engineer and mathematician, was born in Welcome; he served as assistant secretary for research and regulation in the United States Department of the Army.

References

Unincorporated communities in St. James Parish, Louisiana
Unincorporated communities in Louisiana
Census-designated places in St. James Parish, Louisiana
Census-designated places in Louisiana